Two ships of the Royal Navy have borne the name HMS Falkland, probably after the former Royal burgh of Falkland, Fife:

  was a 54-gun fourth-rate ship of the line, purchased in 1696.  She was the first warship to be built in what would become the United States.  She was rebuilt several times and transferred out of the Royal Navy in 1768.
  was an 18-gun sloop launched in 1853 and sold in 1862.

There was also , formerly the 44-gun French fluyt . She was wrecked in 1705, salvaged and then sold in 1706.

Royal Navy ship names